Timothy Serge Martin (born 27 March 2001) is a footballer who plays as a goalkeeper for Seraing on loan from Virton. Born in Belgium, he is a Luxembourg youth international.

Career
In 2020, Martin signed for French fifth tier side Nîmes B. In 2021, he signed for Virton in the Belgian second tier. On 19 December 2021, he debuted for Virton during a 1–1 draw with Westerlo.

On 11 August 2022, Martin joined Seraing on a season-long loan with an option to buy.

References

External links
 

2001 births
Living people
Association football goalkeepers
Belgian expatriate footballers
Belgian expatriate sportspeople in France
Challenger Pro League players
Belgian footballers
Expatriate footballers in France
Luxembourg youth international footballers
Luxembourgian expatriate footballers
Luxembourgian expatriate sportspeople in France
Luxembourgian footballers
R.E. Virton players
R.F.C. Seraing (1922) players